Ratu Tevita Uluilakeba III (October 4, 1898 – October 4, 1966) was the 12th Tui Nayau and Sau ni Vanua of the Lau Islands. He was the father of Ratu Sir Kamisese Mara, founding father of the modern nation of Fiji.

Ratu Te, as he was known, hailed from the chiefly village of Tubou on the island of Lakeba in Lau Province. He became the Tui Nayau upon the death of his father, Ratu Alifereti Finau Ulugalala in 1934. His mother was Adi Ateca Moceiwaqa (or spelled Ateca Moceiwai), paternal granddaughter of Ratu Seru Epenisa Cakobau, the self-proclaimed King of Fiji, and daughter of Ratu Epeli Nailatikau I.

The origin of the Fijian farewell song "Isa Lei" is disputed, and one versions holds that Ratu Tevita Uluilakeba composed it in 1916 for Adi Litia Tavanavanua (1900–1983), when she visited Lakeba in 1916.

Ratu Tevita's offspring

References

External links
Chiefs of the Lau Islands

Lau Islands
1898 births
1966 deaths
Fijian chiefs
Tui Nayau
Vuanirewa